Underneath the Pine is the second album from the artist Toro y Moi, released on February 22, 2011 on Carpark Records. The album was given the "Best New Music" designation by Pitchfork and they placed the album at number 48 on its list of the "Top 50 albums of 2011".

The Korean edition of the album features the bonus track "Ricardo and Ryne."

Track listing

References

2011 albums
Toro y Moi albums
Carpark Records albums